WEMM-FM (107.9 FM, "Gospel 107.9") is a Southern Gospel and religious formatted broadcast radio station licensed to Huntington, West Virginia, serving the Huntington/Charleston area. WEMM-FM is owned and operated by Bristol Broadcasting Company.

Programming
WEMM-FM broadcasts a Southern Gospel and Religious format to the Tri-State Region. This format includes sermons from area pulpits, national Bible teaching ministries, and Southern Gospel music. The station also airs a radio simulcast of the WSAZ NewsChannel 3 Six O'Clock newscast on weekdays.

History
WEMM was first established on September 6, 1971, and has since then maintained its current Gospel format. The station signed on as the third station on the Tower of Faith Radio Network.

The call letters were changed to WEMM-FM on February 2, 2004, when an AM sister station (then known as WHRD) was made a simulcast of the FM signal and its call sign was changed to WEMM. That simulcast arrangement ended and the AM station's callsign was changed to WRWB in September 2008 but the FM station remains at the WEMM-FM callsign.

References

External links
 Gospel 107.9 WEMM official website
 

Huntington, West Virginia
Southern Gospel radio stations in the United States
EMM-FM
Radio stations established in 1971